Spruce Lake is an unincorporated community in west-central Saskatchewan.

History 

The area around Spruce Lake was first settled in 1910. Quite a large number of the first settlers were German. There were also several Scandinavians, British, Ukrainian, Polish, and French settlers. The Canadian Northern Railway (now the Canadian National Railway) came through in 1919 and the first grain elevator was built that year. Cattle was also shipped from Spruce Lake on the railway. The last remaining grain elevator burned down in 1983. Spruce Lake lost village status in 2006. The rail line that ran through the community was abandoned in 2005 and torn up in 2008.

Demographics 

References 

Designated places in Saskatchewan
Former villages in Saskatchewan
Mervin No. 499, Saskatchewan
Populated places disestablished in 2005
Unincorporated communities in Saskatchewan
Division No. 17, Saskatchewan